Ptychoderidae is a family of acorn worms.

Genera and species
The World Register of Marine Species lists the following:

Balanoglossus
Contains the following species:
 Balanoglossus apertus (Spengel, 1893)
 Balanoglossus aurantiacus (Girard, 1853)
 Balanoglossus australiensis (Hill, 1894)
 Balanoglossus borealis (Willey, 1899)
 Balanoglossus capensis (Gilchrist, 1908)
 Balanoglossus carnosus Müller in Spengel, 1893
 Balanoglossus clavigerus delle Chiaje, 1829
 Balanoglossus gigas Müller in Spengel, 1893
 Balanoglossus hydrocephalus van der Horst
 Balanoglossus misakiensis Kuwano, 1902
 Balanoglossus natalensis (Gilchrist, 1908)
 Balanoglossus occidentalis Ritter, 1902
 Balanoglossus proterogonius Belichov, 1928
 Balanoglossus robinii author unknown
 Balanoglossus salmoneus Belichov, 1928
 Balanoglossus stephensoni van der Horst, 1937
 Balanoglossus studiosorum van der Horst

Glossobalanus
Contains the following species:
 Glossobalanus alatus van der Horst
 Glossobalanus barnharti Cameron & Ostiguy, 2013
 Glossobalanus berkeleyi (Willey, 1931)
 Glossobalanus crozieri van der Horst, 1924
 Glossobalanus elongatus Spengel, 1904
 Glossobalanus hartmanae Cameron & Ostiguy, 2013
 Glossobalanus hedleyi (Hill, 1897)
 Glossobalanus indicus Rao, 1955
 Glossobalanus marginatus Meek, 1922
 Glossobalanus minutus Kowalevsky, 1866
 Glossobalanus mortenseni van der Horst, 1932
 Glossobalanus parvulus (Punnett, 1906)
 Glossobalanus ruficollis (Willey, 1899)
 Glossobalanus sarniensis (Koehler, 1886)
 Glossobalanus williami Cameron & Ostiguy, 2013

Ptychodera
Contains the following species:
 Ptychodera bahamensis Spengel, 1893
 Ptychodera ceylonica author unknown
 Ptychodera erythrea Spengel
 Ptychodera flava Eschscholtz, 1825
 Ptychodera pelsarti Dakin, 1916

References

Enteropneusta